Ananaspis is a genus of trilobite in the order Phacopida, which existed in what is now the Czech Republic. It was described by Campbell in 1967, and the type species is Ananaspis fecundis, which was originally described as Phacops fecundus communis by Barrande in 1852.

References

External links
 Ananaspis at the Paleobiology Database
 Ananaspis at Zipcodezoo.com

Fossils of the Czech Republic
Phacopidae
Paleozoic life of Quebec
Trilobites of Europe